The North Lake Line was a local Pacific Electric Railway route serving Pasadena until 1941.

History
Tracks on North Lake Avenue were constructed by the Highland Street Railway Company in early 1894. By 1911, inbound cars on the line were through routed to North Orange Grove Avenue. In January 1913, the line was rerouted via Mendocino Street to Allen Avenue; the branch to Country Club Park on Mendocino Street became the outer terminus that same year. Car 1602 suffered a runaway on the line in 1916, and a derail was installed on Lake south of Mariposa Street to mitigate future issues on the descent from Mt. Lowe. Through routing was changed in July 1923 to the Altadena via the North Fair Oaks Avenue Line, almost forming a loop service. The line north and east of Woodbury and Lake was abandoned on April 3, 1932, and the last car ran on the line on January 19, 1941. Tracks had been removed or paved over by 1981.

Route
The North Lake Line traveled on a double track system in pavement of Lake Avenue from Colorado Boulevard north to Woodbury Road. It then proceeded north on a single track to El Mendocino Street (Mendocino Street) where it turned east to its terminus at Allen Avenue in Altadena.

References

External links

Pacific Electric routes
Altadena, California
Transportation in Pasadena, California
History of Los Angeles County, California
Light rail in California
1894 establishments in California
Railway lines opened in 1894
1941 disestablishments in California
Railway lines closed in 1941
Closed railway lines in the United States